The Isle of Wight County Press is a local, compact newspaper published every Friday on the Isle of Wight.
It had an audited circulation of 23,006 copies, compared to a local population of 140,500. The paper saw a drop in circulation of 13,657 between December 2009 and December 2017 (37.25%). In December 2020 the paper published an article saying that sales remained above 15,000 copies.
The paper had been owned locally from its foundation until July 2017, when it was taken over by Newsquest Media Group.

The Isle of Wight County Press website was launched in 1999 and features headline articles updated on a daily basis. These will often appear on the website before featuring in the next issue, allowing readers to be updated daily instead of each week. The website also features videos and photo galleries that would not normally be available in a standard issue. During June 2009 the website passed 1 million views for the first time, attracting a record figure of 1,001,705 coupled with another record of 71,068 unique visitors. The increase in visitor numbers was said to have been boosted by interest in the Isle of Wight Council election results and Isle of Wight Festival coverage. The Isle of Wight County Press passed its 3 million online viewers in January 2013.

The first compact issue was released on 3 October 2008. Prior to this the paper had always been published in a broadsheet format. The change was made in a response to surveys carried out by the paper in November 2007 claiming 87 percent of islanders in favour of a compact format. Following the first release of the first compact issue, many islanders found the smaller size unsuitable for use on some jobs such as bee keeping.

In June 2017, a takeover offer was received by the paper by Newsquest Media Group, one of the largest local newspaper publishers in the United Kingdom, running other operations locally including the Southern Daily Echo based in Southampton. The offer was met with criticism locally with fears a takeover from a mainland firm could cause the paper to lose its connection to the island. A counter offer made as part of a community bid, however it was ultimately unsuccessful and with the paper being sold to Newsquest in July 2017.

In January 2018 the paper ceased being printed in Newbury, instead moving to Newquest's own printing press in Southampton. At the same time the physical size of the paper decreased.

In January 2020 long serving editor Alan Marriot returned to the County Press, replacing Emily Pearce who has edited the paper for the previous 12 months.

References

External links
 Official Website of the IWCP
 IWCP Facebook Page

Newspapers published on the Isle of Wight
Weekly newspapers published in the United Kingdom
Publications established in 1884
1884 establishments in England